The 1984–85 British Hockey League season was the third season of the British Hockey League. The membership of the Premier League was increased to ten with the inclusion of the Southampton Vikings. Promotion and relegation was also introduced between the Premier League and the first Division.

Autumn Cup

As with the previous season, teams were divided into one Scottish and two English groups. The winner of the Scottish group advanced directly to the final of the competition while the winners of the two English groups took part in a two legged English Final to the determine the overall finalist. The total number of teams taking part was expanded to fifteen.

Scotland

*One game between the Ayr Bruins and Glasgow Dynamos not played.

England

English final
Durham Wasps 6-6 Solihull Barons
Solihull Barons 6-10 Durham Wasps (Durham win 16-12 on aggregate)

Final
The final was played at Streatham Ice Rink.

Durham Wasps 6-4 Fife Flyers

League

Teams level on points were separated by results between them.

Playoffs

The top six teams from the regular season qualified for the playoffs. Group A was made up of Durham, Murrayfield and Streatham while Group B was made up of Fife, Ayr and Cleveland. The semi finals and final were played at Wembley Arena.

Group A

Group B

Semi-finals
Fife Flyers 12-3 Streatham Redskins
Murrayfield Racers 13-4 Ayr Bruins

Final
Fife Flyers 9-4 Murrayfield Racers

References

A to Z Encyclopedia of Ice Hockey

1
United
British Hockey League seasons